Henry Flexmore "Harry" Roberts (born 27 February 1939) was a rugby union player who represented Australia.

Roberts, a fly-half, was born in Brisbane, Queensland and claimed four international rugby caps for Australia. He represented Terrace Rugby as a 1st XV player from year 10 to 12 (1954–56) including the 56' premiership team.

References

External links 
 Brothers Rugby Club History
  Wallabies website

Australian rugby union players
Australia international rugby union players
1939 births
Living people
Rugby union players from Brisbane
Rugby union fly-halves